Lightnin' Wells  is an American Piedmont blues multi-instrumentalist and singer. He is a proficient musician and regularly plays various instruments in concert including the guitar, mandolin, harmonica, ukulele and banjo.  At times he has performed as a one-man band. His style encompasses elements of the blues, country, gospel, old-time, bluegrass and folk. Mark Coltrain stated in Living Blues that, "You won't find a more versatile musician around – able to move deftly between country blues, old-time banjo, and novelty tunes with a single pluck. Lightnin' Wells changes the past..." 

Wells has released six solo albums and worked for ten years on the board of directors at Music Maker Relief Foundation.  His most recent recording was O Lightnin', Where Art Thou? (2017).

Biography
Michael Wells was born in West Virginia, United States, and largely raised in North Carolina, where he has spent most of his life.  In his early days, Wells regularly listened to the Wheeling Jamboree show on WWVA radio out of Wheeling, West Virginia. His family relocated to Goldsboro, North Carolina in 1962, and there Wells discovered and gained a life-long interest in Piedmont blues and old-time music.

He joined his first band, the Unknowns, at the age of thirteen, where he played the harmonica in an ensemble performing British Invasion inspired music. By the late 1960s, Wells had learned to play the guitar and initially tried to follow the work of artists in the folk revival movement, leading him to Bob Dylan chronologically backwards to Woody Guthrie, then Sonny Terry and Lead Belly. The first authentic Piedmont blues record he heard was a 78 recording of "Lookin' For My Woman," by Blind Boy Fuller. Wells started performing professionally in the Chapel Hill area in the early 1970s. In addition to Fuller, Wells also studied the work of the Reverend Gary Davis. As part of his ongoing musical education, Wells sought out still living Piedmont performers, which led him later to produce work by Big Boy Henry, Algia Mae Hinton and George Higgs.

In 1995, Wells made his own debut solo recording, Bull Frog Blues, which was followed by Ragtime Millionaire (1998); both released on New Moon Records. "I'll Be Coming Home Every Saturday Night", written by Turner Foddrell was one of the tracks on Ragtime Millionaire. By this time Wells was blending Piedmont and country blues utilizing a mixture of acoustic and resonator guitars, ukulele and harmonica. Wells had joined Music Maker in 1996, and in 2002 released his next album on that label. Ragged But Right included guest appearances by Cool John Ferguson on guitar and Taj Mahal on bass. Wells also began his ten-year spell on the board of directors at the Music Maker Relief Foundation. During this time Music Maker's assistance enabled Wells to perform at Playa Zancudo in Costa Rica, at Warehouse Blues and the Shakori Hills Grassroots Festival in North Carolina.

Shake 'Em on Down (2008) gave Wells further opportunity to revisit some songs of the 1920s and produce an authentic sounding album. His journey has left him with hundreds of old pieces in his musical mind, and he discovered the work of Floyd Council to add to his repertoire.  Wells was not tempted to pen his own material, despite having a university degree in English. In 2005, Wells traveled to Boone, North Carolina for the first Black Banjo Gathering where he accompanied Algia Mae Hinton. Over the years Wells has performed at The Great Blue Heron Music Festival, Gathering of the Vibes (2002), Chicago Blues Festival (2000), Hampton Acoustic Blues Revival (2006), Moulin Blues Festival (1996), the Bull Durham Blues Festival (1990, 1993, 1995, 1998, and 2000), Festival for the Eno, (1981 onwards), among many others.

In 2008, Wells recorded Jump Little Children: Old Songs For Young Folks, a collection of children's music. In addition, Wells has taught blues guitar across the United States, with his goal being to entertain and educate in presenting the unique American art form. He is a regular faculty member at the Augusta Heritage Center, Port Townsend Acoustic Blues Festival and Swannanoa Gathering.  Wells is a North Carolina Arts Council and American Traditions National Roster (through the Southern Arts Federation), touring artist. In 2016, Wells performed at Muddy Creek Music Hall in Winston-Salem, North Carolina. 

Lightnin' Wells currently resides in Fountain, North Carolina. A proposed 2015 documentary film, Straight-Six Blues, which features Wells is still in post-production.  In July 2015, Wells was on the same bill as Ironing Board Sam and Boo Hanks at a concert in the Sarah P. Duke Gardens, Duke University, Durham, North Carolina.

His latest album, O Lightnin', Where Art Thou? (2017), was issued by the Germany-based Blind Lemon Records. Wells played all of the instruments used on the collection.  The tracks included Wells versions of Mississippi John Hurt's "Pallet on the Floor," Jesse Fuller's "San Francisco Bay Blues" and Robert Johnson's "Love in Vain".

Production work
Big Boy Henry, "Mr. President/I Don't Need No Heater" 45 (Audio Arts),1983
 Big Boy Henry, "Mr. Ball Your Warehouse Is Burning Down" EP (Audio Arts), 1985
Algia Mae Hinton, Piedmont Blues Traditions, EP (Audio Arts), 1986
Co-produced and performed on Big Boy Henry, Poor Man's Blues (New Moon 9508), 1995
Algia Mae Hinton, Honey Babe: Blues, Folk Tunes and Gospel from North Carolina (Hin-Tone 82929), 1996

Discography

See also
List of Piedmont blues musicians

References

External links
Official website

Year of birth missing (living people)
Living people
American blues guitarists
American male guitarists
American blues singers
American male singers
American blues harmonica players
American blues mandolinists
American ukulele players
American banjoists
Guitarists from West Virginia
Singers from West Virginia
Blues musicians from West Virginia
Guitarists from North Carolina
Singers from North Carolina
Folk musicians from North Carolina
Piedmont blues musicians
One-man bands